Haugan & Lindgren was a bank headquartered in Chicago, Illinois. The bank operated from December 8, 1879, until February 10, 1891, from quarters at No. 57 and No. 59 La Salle Street. The bank was a partnership of Helge Alexander Haugan, H. G. Haugan and John R. Lindgren. Haugan & Lindgren was a predecessor of the State Bank of Chicago.

References

Other resources
Henschen, Henry S.  A History of The State Bank Of Chicago From 1879 To 1904  (Kessinger Publishing, LLC. Chicago. pages 15–20. 1905)
Currey, J. Seymour    Chicago, its history and its builders, A century of marvelous growth(S. J. Clark Publishing Company. Chicago. pages 340-342. 1912)
Olson, Ernest W. History of the Swedes of Illinois (Engberg-Holmberg Publishing.Chicago .1908)

External links
“History of Norwegians of Illinois”

Defunct banks of the United States
History of Chicago